Kastoria (Perifereiakí Enótita Kastoriás) is one of the 74 regional units of Greece and is part of the region of Western Macedonia. Its capital is the homonymous city of Kastoria.

Geography
Kastoria is situated at the western end of Macedonia in the far north of the country. It borders the regional units of Florina to the north, Kozani to the southeast, Grevena to the south and Ioannina to the southwest. The area of the regional unit roughly corresponds to the ancient Greek region of Orestis of Upper Macedonia. The international border with the Albanian district of Korçë lies on the western edge of the regional unit.

The main mountain ranges are Gramos and Voio in the west (both part of the Pindus range) and Verno in the northeast. The Haliacmon river flows through the area. Lake Orestiada is the largest lake. The  regional unit is mountainous with a pronounced continental climate, characterised by cold winters and hot summers.

Administration

The regional unit Kastoria is subdivided into 3 municipalities. These are (number as in the map in the infobox):
Kastoria (1)
Nestorio (2)
Orestida (3)

Prefecture

Kastoria was created as a prefecture in 1941. As a part of the 2011 Kallikratis government reform, the regional unit Kastoria was created out of the former prefecture Kastoria. The prefecture had the same territory as the present regional unit. At the same time, the municipalities were reorganised, according to the table below.

Transport
GR-15, S, Cen., NE
GR-20/E90, S, only passes through Eptachori

See also
 List of settlements in the Kastoria regional unit
 Dispilio Tablet

References

 
Prefectures of Greece
Regional units of Western Macedonia